Music and Words is the seventh studio album by Scottish musician Malcolm Middleton. It was released in December 2014 under Melodic Records.

Track list

References

2014 albums
Malcolm Middleton albums